The 1989 Lion Brown New Zealand Masters was a professional invitational snooker tournament which took place in August 1989 at the Legislative Chamber of the New Zealand Parliament in  Wellington, New Zealand.

Willie Thorne won the tournament beating Joe Johnson 7–4 in the final.

Main draw

Third place match:  Tony Knowles 6–3 Stephen Hendry

References

New Zealand Masters (snooker)
New Zealand Masters
New Zealand Masters
New Zealand Masters